Clíona Ní Mhurchú is a New Zealand population nutrition academic, she is currently a professor at the University of Auckland and Nutrition Lead at the National Institute for Health Innovation.

Career
After training at Trinity College Dublin and a PhD from the University of Southampton entitled  'Effectiveness of motivational interviewing in dietary education for people with hyperlipidaemia' , Ní Mhurchú stated work at the University of Auckland where she rose to full professor.

In 1999-02 and 2010–13 Ní Mhurchú received funding from the Heart Foundation of New Zealand and she is on a number of national and international technical advisory groups.

Her research regularly gets covered in the mainstream New Zealand press.

Selected works 
 Anderson, Craig; Sally Rubenach; Cliona Ni Mhurchu; Michael Clark; Carol Spencer, and Adrian Winsor. "Home or hospital for stroke rehabilitation? Results of a randomized controlled trial." Stroke 31, no. 5 (2000): 1024–1031.
 James, W. Philip T., Rachel Jackson-Leach, Cliona Ni Mhurchu, Eleni Kalamara, Maryam Shayeghi, Neville J. Rigby, Chizuru Nishida, and Anthony Rodgers. "Overweight and obesity (high body mass index)." Comparative quantification of health risks: global and regional burden of disease attribution to selected major risk factors 1 (2004): 497–596.
 Maddison, Ralph, Cliona Ni Mhurchu, Andrew Jull, Yannan Jiang, Harry Prapavessis, and Anthony Rodgers. "Energy expended playing video console games: an opportunity to increase children’s physical activity?." Pediatric exercise science 19, no. 3 (2007): 334–343.
 Utter, Jennifer, Robert Scragg, Cliona Ni Mhurchu, and David Schaaf. "At-home breakfast consumption among New Zealand children: associations with body mass index and related nutrition behaviors." Journal of the American Dietetic Association 107, no. 4 (2007): 570–576.
 Maddison, Ralph, Louise Foley, Cliona Ni Mhurchu, Yannan Jiang, Andrew Jull, Harry Prapavessis, Maea Hohepa, and Anthony Rodgers. "Effects of active video games on body composition: a randomized controlled trial." The American Journal of Clinical Nutrition 94, no. 1 (2011): 156–163.

References

External links
 

New Zealand women academics
Alumni of the University of Southampton
Academic staff of the University of Auckland
Women nutritionists
New Zealand nutritionists
Alumni of Trinity College Dublin
Living people
Year of birth missing (living people)
21st-century Irish people